This is a list of defunct airlines of Cabo Verde.

See also

 List of airlines of Cape Verde
 List of airports in Cape Verde

References

Cape Verde
Airlines
Airlines, defunct